Samuel Clement Bradford (10 January 1878 in London – 13 November 1948) was a British mathematician, librarian and documentalist at the Science Museum in London. He developed "Bradford's law" (or the "law of scattering") regarding differences in demand for scientific journals. This work influences bibliometrics and citation analysis of scientific publications. Bradford founded the British Society for International Bibliography  (BSIB) (est. 1927) and he was elected president of International Federation for Information and Documentation (FID) in 1945. Bradford was a strong proponent of the UDC and of establishing abstracts of the scientific literature.

Bibliography
Bradford, S. C. (1934). Sources of information on specific subjects. Engineering, 26, p. 85–86.
Bradford, S. C. (1946). Romance of Roses.  London: F. Muller.
Bradford, S. C. (1948). Documentation. London: Crosby Lockwood.
Bradford, S. C. (1953). Documentation. 2nd ed. With an introd. by Jesse H. Shera and Margaret E. Egan. London: Crosby Lockwood.

References
Gosset, M. & Urquhart, D. J. (1977). S. C. Bradford, Keeper of the Science Museum Library 1925-1937. Journal of Documentation, 33, 173-179.

English librarians
Information scientists
British information theorists
1878 births
1948 deaths
Bibliometricians